Empress Qiang (強皇后, personal name unknown) (died 356), formally Empress Mingde (明德皇后, literally "the understanding and virtuous empress"), was an empress of the Di-led Former Qin dynasty of China. Her husband was Former Qin's founding emperor, Fu Jiàn (Emperor Jingming).

She appeared to be Fu Jiàn's wife during the time that he was heir apparent to his father Fu Hong (苻洪), a major general and Di chieftain during Later Zhao.  When Fu Jiàn declared himself the "Heavenly Prince" (Tian Wang) in 351 during the middle of Later Zhao's collapse, he created her "Heavenly Princess" (Tian Wanghou, 天王后).  In 352, when he declared himself emperor, he created her empress.  She had at least three sons—Fu Chang (苻萇), Fu Sheng, and Fu Liu (苻柳).  Fu Chang, as the oldest, was created the crown prince in 351.  Her brother Qiang Ping (強平) became a key advisor to Fu Jiàn.

In 354, Crown Prince Chang suffered an arrow wound while commanding an army resisting a major attack by the Jin general Huan Wen, and he died later that year from the wound.  Empress Qiang wanted her youngest son, Fu Liu the Prince of Jin, to be crown prince.  However, Fu Jiàn, believing in mysterious prophecies that appeared to indicate their violent son Fu Sheng the Prince of Huai'nan should be the next emperor, created Fu Sheng crown prince.  After Fu Jiàn died in 355, Fu Sheng succeeded him, and he honored her as empress dowager.

Fu Sheng's reign was a violent and capricious one, as he killed many high-level officials with little reason.  In summer 356, there were rumors that bandits were about to attack the capital Chang'an, which resulted in a great panic in the capital lasting five days.  Fu Sheng investigated the rumors and ordered that all persons who spread the rumors be executed by having their chests cut open and hearts pulled out.  Qiang Ping, as his uncle, tried to persuade him not to carry out such cruel punishment, and Fu Sheng became angry at him, first fracturing his skull with a hammer and then executing him, despite intercessions from three generals he trusted.  A month later, Empress Dowager Qiang died in sadness and fear.

References 

|-

Former Qin empresses
356 deaths
Year of birth unknown